The Fărău is a left tributary of the river Mureș in Transylvania, Romania. It discharges into the Mureș near Noșlac. Its name means "Hot Creek" in Hungarian.

References

Rivers of Romania
Rivers of Alba County